Frank (originally Franz) Buchser (1828–1890) was a Swiss painter. He is noted for his portraits of notable American figures of the post civil war period and for his works with Oriental themes.

Life and work

Born Franz Buchser on 15 August 1828 near Solothurn in Switzerland, he was the son of a farmer, Niklaus Josef and his wife Anna Maria, née Walker. At the age of 18 years he was apprenticed to a piano builder and organ maker. However, his apprenticeship ended abruptly when the master found him in bed with his daughter.

In 1847, he decided to become a painter, and took drawing lessons from the Bern artist, Heinrich von Arx (1802–58). He travelled to Rome via Paris and Florence and studied art in Paris, Antwerp and at the Accademia di San Luca in Rome. While in Rome, he financed his studies by working for the Swiss Guard. Although he took art lessons here and there, the bulk of his art education was primarily self-taught.

Buchser travelled extensively in Europe, Africa and England. A personal highlight of his travels was a visit to Fez, Morocco in 1858 where he painted many street scenes and pictures of the Bedouin people. In 1862, he was active as commissioner of the Department of Swiss Art at the World's Fair in London.

In 1866, Buchser visited the United States and remained there until 1871. He painted scenes of the American plains, with an emphasis on color that was new at the time. He caught up with a military expedition led by General William T. Sherman and painted scenes of the places they visited, including Fort Laramie. While in the US, he painted portraits of many notable personalities, including President Andrew Johnson, Secretary of State, William Seward and General Sherman  and the last known portrait of Robert E. Lee. He also painted a series depicting African Americans in a sympathetic manner. During this period, he Americanised his name to Frank, and retained that form for the rest of his life.

In his final years, he returned to his native Switzerland where he campaigned for a reform of the art exhibition system and was a supporter of the "Swiss Federal Decree on the Promotion and Elevation of Swiss Art" (1887).

Stylistically, Buchser's work was very versatile. He has been described as an Orientalist painter and as a realist. His oeuvre comprises about 1000 works in oil, including about 300 full paintings. The remainder are mostly independent sketches, often executed with spiritedly rapid strokes, which show the artist's pronounced sense of color and light. The most important collection of his works are in the Kunstmuseum Solothurn (80 paintings) and the Kunstmuseum Basel (over 1000 oil sketches, drawings and watercolors and sketchbooks).

He died on November 22, 1890 in Solothurn.

Select list of paintings

 Street Scene in Algiers (c.1850)
 Bedouin Seated with Pen and Paper n.d.
 Naked Slave with Tambourine 
 Portrait of Andrew Johnson
 Portrait of Robert E. Lee (c. 1870; Currently in the residence of the Swiss ambassador to the U.S, Washington D.C.)
 Portrait of William Tecumseh Sherman (Currently in the residence of the Swiss ambassador to the U.S, Washington D.C.)
 Portrait of William Seward
 The Song of Mary Blane
 Four Black Marble Players (1867)
 Old Virginia (c. 1870)
 Los Tres Amigos n.d.

Gallery

References

19th-century Swiss painters
Swiss male painters
1828 births
1890 deaths
American landscape painters
Orientalist painters
People from Solothurn
19th-century Swiss male artists